Bunker Bean is a 1936 American black-and-white comedy film adapted from a novel by Harry Leon Wilson and the subsequent play adapted by Lee Wilson Dodd. It was directed by William Hamilton and Edward Killy, produced by William Sistrom, and starred Owen Davis, Jr. as the title character. The cast included Lucille Ball as Mrs Kelly.

Plot summary

Cast
 Owen Davis, Jr. as Bunker Bean
 Louise Latimer as Mary Kent
 Robert McWade as John 'J.C.' Kent
 Jessie Ralph as Grandmother
 Lucille Ball as Rosie Kelly
 Berton Churchill as Professor Balthazer
 Edward Nugent as Mr. Glab
 Hedda Hopper as Dorothy Kent
 Ferdinand Gottschalk as Dr. Meyerhauser
 Leonard Carey as Butler
 Russell Hicks as Al C. Jones
 Sibyl Harris as Countess Cassandra

References

External links
 
 
 
 
 Bunker Bean synopsis on a Lucy website

1936 films
1930s English-language films
American black-and-white films
1936 comedy films
American comedy films
Films directed by Edward Killy
Films directed by William Hamilton (film editor)
RKO Pictures films
Films scored by Arthur Lange
1930s American films